El cuarto mandamiento (Spanish: The Fourth Commandment) is a 1948 Mexican drama film directed by Rolando Aguilar and starring Domingo Soler, Carmelita González, Sara Montes and Emma Roldán. The film's sets were designed by Manuel Fontanals. The film is about a family that is worried that their daughter is courted by a rich young man who likes the nightlife and luxury cars. The film is considered part of a group of family melodramas made in this period in which the dramatic tension revolves around old values, linked to a conservative order rooted in the past, which are pitted against new values associated with modernity, such as Cuando los hijos se van and A Family Like Many Others.

Cast
Domingo Soler as Don Gustavo García
Carmelita González as Cristina
Sara Montes as Anita
Emma Roldán as Lupe
Víctor Parra as David González
Pepe del Río as Eduardo
Azucena Rodríguez as Pita
Manuel Noriega as Don Eusebio Echeverría
Pepe Nava as Don Melchor
Enrique Zambrano as Don Ricardo
Victorio Blanco as Don Isaac Martínez
Alfredo Varela as Sacerdote
Elisa Christy as Empleada de oficina de tienda (uncredited)
Conchita Gentil Arcos as María Luisa Lucio, enfermera abortista (uncredited)
Gloria Lozano as Empleada de tienda (uncredited)

References

Bibliography
 García Riera, Emilio. Los hermanos Soler. Universidad de Guadalajara, Centro de Investigación y Enseñanza Cinematográficas. 1990.

External links

1948 films
1948 drama films
Mexican black-and-white films
Mexican drama films
1940s Mexican films
1940s Spanish-language films